Ruq'a (Arabic: رقعة) is a Palestinian Village in the Hebron governorate of the southern West Bank located about 5 miles south of Hebron & roughly 22 miles south of Jerusalem. It is best known for its olive production.

References

Hebron Governorate
Villages in the West Bank